Blaniulus mayeti is a species of millipede in the Blaniulidae family that is endemic to France.

References

Julida
Millipedes of Europe
Endemic arthropods of Metropolitan France
Animals described in 1902